Scotland Street may refer to:

Scotland Street, Suffolk
Scotland Street, Glasgow
A street in Edinburgh, the setting for the 44 Scotland Street novels of Alexander McCall Smith